The 1891 Northern Maori by-election was a by-election during the 11th New Zealand Parliament. The election was held on 7 February 1891.

The seat of Northern Maori became vacant following the death of the sitting member Sydney Taiwhanga on 27 November 1890.

Taiwhango had been re-elected in 1890 for Northern Maori, but died on election day. He also stood in Eastern Maori, and came second.

The by-election was won by Eparaima Te Mutu Kapa.

Results
The following table gives the election results:

References

Northern Maori 1891
1891 elections in New Zealand
Māori politics